The Mumuye are people of the Taraba State, Nigeria. They speak the Mumuye language. They constitute the largest tribal group in Taraba State of Nigeria and form the predominant tribes found in Zing, Yorro, Jalingo, Ardo-Kola, Lau, Gassol, Bali and Gashaka, all of which are local government areas of the state. The Mumuye people are also found in many parts of the neighboring Adamawa State.

The Mumuye people have a rich artistic tradition, much of which is figurative. These figural sculptures are used for divination and for healing.

References 

Ethnic groups in Nigeria